Atiyeh (also Romanized as ʿAṭīyeh; also known as ʿAṭīyeh Mandovan) is a village in Jaffal Rural District, in the Central District of Shadegan County, Khuzestan Province, Iran. At the 2006 census, its population was 115, in 18 families.

References 

Populated places in Shadegan County